The prayer before a crucifix is a Roman Catholic prayer to Jesus. It is often said by Roman Catholics after Communion or after Mass. The faithful receive a partial indulgence if they recite the prayer after Communion before a crucifix. On the Fridays of Lent, the indulgence is a plenary indulgence.

History
The original prayer dates to about 1205 and is commonly ascribed to Francis of Assisi while at San Damiano. The prayer echoes Psalm 22:17-18; it may also have been influenced by the opening prayer of the Eucharistic liturgy.

Words of the prayer

Look down upon me, good and gentle Jesus, 
while before Thy face I humbly kneel and,
with burning soul,
pray and beseech Thee 
to fix deep in my heart lively sentiments
of faith, hope and charity;
true contrition for my sins,
and a firm purpose of amendment. 

While I contemplate,
with great love and tender pity, 
Thy five most precious wounds,
pondering over them within me 
and calling to mind the words which David,
Thy prophet, said of Thee, my Jesus:
"They have pierced My hands and My feet, 
they have numbered all My bones." 

Amen.

Alternative version

Behold, O good and sweetest Jesus, 
I cast myself upon my knees in Thy sight,
and with the most fervent desire of my soul 
I pray and beseech Thee 
to impress upon my heart 
lively sentiments of faith, 
hope and charity, 
with true repentance for my sins 
and a most firm desire of amendment.

Whilst with deep affection and grief of soul 
I consider within myself 
and mentally contemplate 
Thy five most precious wounds,
having before my eyes that which David, 
the prophet, long ago spoke concerning Thee, 
“They have pierced My hands and My feet, 
they have numbered all My bones.”

See also
 Prayer in the Catholic Church
 Catholic devotions to Jesus

References

Roman Catholic prayers